Dariusz Płatek (born 26 July 1966) is a Polish former ice hockey player. He played for Zagłębie Sosnowiec and Unia Oświęcim during his career. He also played for the Polish national team at the 1992 Winter Olympics.

External links
 

1966 births
Living people
Ice hockey players at the 1992 Winter Olympics
KH Zagłębie Sosnowiec players
Olympic ice hockey players of Poland
People from Sosnowiec
Polish ice hockey centres
TH Unia Oświęcim players